Brian Kevin Emmanuel Guerra (born 8 February 1996) is an Argentine footballer currently playing for Nueva Chicago.

Career
Guerra started with All Boys. He made two appearances throughout the 2016–17 Primera B Nacional campaign, coming off the bench against Instituto on 16 May 2017 before starting a win over Central Córdoba in the succeeding July. Guerra subsequently featured twenty-one times in 2017–18 as they were relegated, with the midfielder netting his first goal versus Mitre on 25 February 2018. Guerra was loaned out to Primera C Metropolitana's Real Pilar in August 2019, subsequently appearing three times.

Career statistics
.

References

External links

1996 births
Living people
Sportspeople from Buenos Aires Province
Argentine footballers
Association football midfielders
Primera Nacional players
Primera B Metropolitana players
Primera C Metropolitana players
All Boys footballers
Real Pilar Fútbol Club players
Nueva Chicago footballers